Pop Evil is the fifth studio album by American rock band Pop Evil, released on February 16, 2018.

Reception
The album received mixed reviews. It is the first album to feature Hayley Cramer on drums.

Track listing

Personnel
Leigh Kakaty – lead vocals
Nick Fuelling – guitar, backing vocals
Dave Grahs – guitar, backing vocals
Matt DiRito – bass, backing vocals
Hayley Cramer – drums

Charts

Album

Singles

References

2018 albums
Pop Evil albums
E1 Music albums